The Grammy Award for Best Traditional Pop Vocal Album is an award presented to recording artists at the Grammy Awards, a ceremony that was established in 1958 and originally called the Gramophone Awards. Honors in several categories are presented at the ceremony annually by the National Academy of Recording Arts and Sciences of the United States to "honor artistic achievement, technical proficiency and overall excellence in the recording industry, without regard to album sales or chart position".

The award has been presented every year since 1992, though it has had two name changes throughout its history. In 1992 the award was known as Best Traditional Pop Performance, from 1993 to 2000 the award was known as Best Traditional Pop Vocal Performance, and since 2001 it has been awarded as Best Traditional Pop Vocal Album. Apart from the first year it was presented, the award has been designated for "albums containing 51% or more playing time of vocal tracks", with "traditional" referring to the "composition, vocal styling, and the instrumental arrangement" of the body of music known as the Great American Songbook.

The 1992 award was presented to Natalie Cole for the spliced-together duet of her and her father, Nat King Cole, performing his original recording of "Unforgettable". This is the only instance in which the traditional pop award was awarded for a song, as opposed to an album. Prior to 2001, the Grammy was presented to the performing artists only; since then the award has been given to the performing artists, the engineers/mixers, as well as the producers, provided they worked on more than 51 percent of playing time on the album. Producers and engineers who worked on less than 50 percent of playing time of the album, as well as mastering engineers do not win an award, but can apply for a Winners Certificate.

Recipients

  Each year is linked to the article about the Grammy Awards held that year.
  Award only went to a producer of the album, not the performing artist(s).

Artists with multiple wins

14 wins
 Tony Bennett

5 wins
 Michael Bublé

2 wins
 Natalie Cole
 Willie Nelson
 Lady Gaga

Artists with multiple nominations

17 nominations
 Tony Bennett

13 nominations
 Barbra Streisand

9 nominations
 Michael Bublé

7 nominations
 Rosemary Clooney

6 nominations
 Harry Connick Jr.

5 nominations
 Michael Feinstein
 Barry Manilow
 Rod Stewart

4 nominations
 Willie Nelson
 Johnny Mathis

3 nominations
 Natalie Cole
 Bob Dylan
 Josh Groban
 Seth MacFarlane
 Bette Midler
 Bernadette Peters

2 nominations
 Julie Andrews
 Lady Gaga
 Norah Jones
 Sarah McLachlan
 Liza Minnelli
 Diane Schuur
 Bobby Short
 Carly Simon
 Frank Sinatra
 James Taylor
 Rufus Wainwright

See also
 Jazz standard
 Tin Pan Alley

References

Sources
  Note: User must select the "Traditional Pop" category as the genre under the search feature.

 
1992 establishments in the United States
Album awards
Awards established in 1992
Traditional Pop Vocal Album
Traditional Pop Vocal Album